The 2010 season is SK Brann's 102nd season and their 24th consecutive season in the Norwegian Premier League.

Information

Team kit
The team kits for the 2010 season were produced by Kappa and the main shirt sponsor was Sparebanken Vest. Other sponsors featured on the kit were BKK (shoulders), JM Byggholt (chest), AXA (left arm), Chess (upper back), Frydenbø (shorts) and Tide (socks).

Squad

Out on loan

Transfers

Results 
The table below shows the results of all of SK Brann's official matches during the 2010-season.

*Due to the 2010 Eurovision Song Contest behind held at Stabæks homeground Telenor Arena, this match and Stabæk's home fixture against IK Start was played at Ullevaal Stadion in Oslo.

Highlights

January 1: Knut Walde's contract expired. He had been loaned out to Løv-Ham since the 2008 season. Due to studies in physiatrics, he decided to take a six-month break from football
January 1: Kristján Örn Sigurðsson's contract expired. He turned down an offer from Brann in March 2009, citing a wish to play abroad. His agent claimed interest from clubs in England and Austria. Sigurðsson signed with the newly promoted Tippliga-club Hønefoss BK on January 7.
January 22: Erik Mjelde signed a four-year deal with Brann, returning to Bergen after four seasons in Sandefjord.
February 16: Brann and Løv-Ham agreed on a one-year loan-deal for the talented striker Matias Møvik.
March 13: Brann opened the premiership season with a 0-0 draw against FK Haugesund at home. This match marked the earliest season opener in Norwegian football history.
March 29: Brann took their first three-pointer of the season in a 3-2 win over Sandefjord. This match marked the first Tippeliga match on Brann Stadion since April 18, 2006 to feature an attendance lower than 15,000.
April 14: Bjørn Dahl resigned as managing director of Brann after ten years in the position. Branns vice-chairman Lars Moldestad was temporarily appointed as new managing director.
May 3: Steinar Nilsen was given the position director of football in addition to his job as head coach. Roald Bruun-Hanssen who had held the job as director since 2007 was given the newly created position of "Operative leader/Strategic controller", working as assistant and deputy to the managing director Lars Moldestad.
May 5: David Nielsen announced his intention to retire when his contract expires on June 30.
May 13: Brann advanced to the second round of the Norwegian Cup after a 2-0 win over Arna-Bjørnar.
May 19: Brann was knocked-out of Norwegian Cup after a shocking 0-1 defeat against the fourth-tier team Fyllingen in the second round of the tournament.
May 21: News broke that Steinar Nilsen had resigned as head coach of SK Brann after a terrible start to the season, where Brann only managed to capture ten points in their first 12 matches, placing them on a thirteenth  place on the table, only two points from relegation. The club was also knocked-out of the Norwegian Cup after losing to Fyllingen, a team consisting of amateurs and who at the time played in the fourth-tier in Norway. His resignation came, supposedly, after a meeting with the players, where they criticised some of his methods and questioned his competence.
May 22: Steinar Nilsen held a press conference where he confirmed the news that leaked out to the media the previous day. He was finished in Brann and had decided to move back to his home town Tromsø. Nilsens assistant Rune Skarsfjord took over as head coach and Director of football in a caretaker-role until Brann could find a new head coach.
May 29: Brann announced that Ólafur Örn Bjarnason would be leaving the club on August 1 to join his childhood club Grindavík in a player-head coach position.
June 2: Brann took another hit on the human resources side when Hans Brandtun announced his immediate resignation as chairman, stating that stress and high work rate made it impossible for him to continue. Lars Moldestad took over his duties in addition to his job as Managing Director. Since the start of the season Brann had lost its managing director, head coach, director of football and chairman.
June 5: David Nielsen signed an extension to his contract allowing him to play throughout July.
June 6: Brann entered the summer break with a 2-1 win against Aalesund in front of a packed Brann Stadion. With 14 of 30 rounds played, Brann climbed to a 13th place on the table with 13 points, 2 points above relegation and 17 points behind the leading team Rosenborg.
June 9: Lars Moldestad announced that Rune Skarsfjord would continue in his caretaker role at Brann throughout  the 2010-season.
June 14: Brann signed Christian Kalvenes for the third time in his career, giving him a contract throughout the 2010-season. The 33-year-old defender signed on a free transfer after ending his employment with Burnley in April 2010.
July 19: Brann signed the Hungarian center back Zsolt Korcsmár on a six-month loan deal from Újpest FC.
July 30: David Nielsen signed an extension to his contract allowing him to finish the season in Brann. He was also given a minor role in the coaching staff.
August 10 Brann bought the talented local lad Fredrik Haugen from Løv-Ham. The youngster signed a three-year deal with the club. It was decided that it would be best for Haugen to finish off the season in Løv-Ham with the transfer deal coming into effect in November 2010.
August 12: Brann brought in two young Brazilian talents on a loan deal. Jacinto Júnior Conceição Cabral and Diego Henrique Pachega de Souza came from Desportivo Brasil whom Brann had made a collaboration deal with earlier in the summer. The players were initially brought in to play for the reserve team, but if proven worthy, both would get the chance to play for the first team.
August 20: Roald Bruun-Hansen was hired as new managing director of Brann.
August 27: Bjarte Haugsdal went to Løv-Ham on a loan deal for the remainder of the season.
September 15: Lars Grorud signed a three-year contract with Brann. Songdal's skipper came on a fee transfer and would join Brann in January 2011.
September 15: Jan Gunnar Solli agreed to a deal with New York Red Bulls pending a medical in December.
October 21: Cato Guntveit announced his decision to retire after the season. The local lad played 13 years for the club over two spells.
October 26: Eirik Bakke signed a three-year contract with Songdal, leaving Brann on a free transfer after the season.
October 27:  Gylfi Einarsson signed a three-year deal with Icelandic side Fylkir. The midfielder was not offered a new contract with Brann and left on a free transfer at the conclusion of the season.
November 1: Rune Skarsfjord was announced as Brann's new head coach after signing a three-year deal with the club. The former assistant coach had been in charge of the team in a caretaker role since Steinar Nilsen agreed to end his employment with Brann at the end of May 2010.
November 7:  Brann finished of a horrible season with a 1-1 draw against Odd Grenland at Brann Stadion. Brann ended up as number 13 in the league, two places above direct relegation and only one place and seven points above relegation play-off. This was Branns lowest league placement in history, but due to several expansions of the Norwegian Premier League over the years, Brann did not get relegated this season.
November 11:  Petter Vaagan Moen signed a two and a half year deal with Queens Park Rangers after his contract with Brann expired. While Branns top goalscorer left for London, a fresh face was announced at Brann Stadion as Kongsvinger's Carl-Erik Torp was signed on a free transfer.
November 19:  Petter Vaagan Moen was crowned Brann's player of the year by local newspaper Bergens Tidende. He had previously been given the same honour by the Brann supporters.
November 21:  Matias Møvik was told his contract with Brann would not be renewed. He prepared himself for a new season in Løv-Ham, the club he was loaned out to during the 2010 season.
December 8:  Brann signed a three-year deal with Kim Ojo. The Nigerian striker came on a free transfer from Nybergsund IL-Trysil.

Statistics

Appearances and goals

The table shows matches and goals in the Norwegian Premier League and Norwegian Cup, and was last updated after the game against Odd Grenland on November 7, 2010

|}

Top goalscorers
Includes all competitive matches. The list is sorted by shirt number when total goals are equal.

Last updated on 7 November 2010

Disciplinary record 
Includes all competitive matches.

Overall

References

2010
Norwegian football clubs 2010 season